Miss Grand Paraguay is an annual female beauty pageant based in Asunción of Paraguay, founded in 2017 by Gabriel Roman of MGM Productions, aiming to select the country representatives to compete in various international pageants including its parent pageant, Miss Grand International, in which Paraguay won the main title once in 2018, by Clara Sosa of Asunción, and was placed among the Top 20 semifinalists three times in 2017, 2019 and 2022 by Lía Ashmore, Milena Rodríguez and Agatha León, respectively.

The reigning Miss Grand Paraguay is Agatha León of Ciudad del Este who was crowned on 7 May 2022 at the Hotel Guaraní Asunción, she will represent Paraguay in Miss Grand International 2022.

Background

History
Paraguay made its debutant at Miss Grand International in 2013, with the representation of a Asunción-based fashion model Sendy Cáceres, followed by Giselle Sotomayor in 2014, but both of them finished as non-placement. After the country had no licensee in 2015, Gabriel Roman of MGM Productions, the Asunción organizer company, acquired the franchise in the following year, and subsequently appointed Cindy Nordmann Arias to represent the country at Miss Grand International 2016, held in Las Vegas of the United States, unfortunately, also went unplaced.

Under the management of MGM Productions, the first contest of Miss Grand Paraguay finally happened in 2017, featuring 16 national finalists who were selected by various local licensees as well as the national organizer. Since then, the pageant has been held annually to determine the country representatives for such an international contest.

The pageant, originally scheduled to be held on 15 March, was canceled for the first time in 2020, resulting from the spike of SARS-CoV-2 Delta variant positive cases in Paraguay. The organizer decided to appoint Daisy Lezcano of Isla Pucú, one of the pageant candidates, to participate at the international stage. Meanwhile, the remainder of delegates goes to compete in the 2021 edition instead.

In 2022, Kendal Hirschfeld, also known as La Comadre on social media, became the first openly transgender to compete for the Miss Grand Paraguay title.

Location and date
The following list is the edition detail of the Miss Grand Paraguay contest, since its inception in 2017.

Titleholders

Winner gallery

National finalists
The following list is the national finalists of the Miss Grand Paraguay pageant, as well as the competition results.

Color keys
 Declared as the winner
 Ended as a runner-up (Top 5)
 Ended as a semifinalist (Top 10/11)
 Did not participate
 Withdraw during the competition

References

External links

 

Paraguay
Beauty pageants in Paraguay
Recurring events established in 2017
2017 establishments in Paraguay
Paraguayan awards